Opt-out is the term used in broadcasting when a nation or region splits from the main national output.

Opt out may refer to:
 Opt-out (politics)
 Opt-outs in the European Union
 Opting out (Canada)